The Liberian Women's First Division called LFA Women's First Division is the top flight of women's association football in Liberia. The competition is run by the Liberia Football Association.

History
The first Liberian women's championship started on 2001.

Champions
The list of champions and runners-up:

Most successful clubs

See also 
 Liberian FA Women's Cup
 Liberian Women's Super Cup

References

External links
 Liberian W-First Division fb page

Women's association football leagues in Africa
Football competitions in Liberia
Women
2001 establishments in Liberia
Sports leagues established in 2001
Women's sport in Liberia